Zhao Te-yin (born 18 December 1982), also known as Midi Z, is a Myanmar-born Taiwanese film director. His 2014 film Ice Poison was selected as the Taiwanese entry for the Best Foreign Language Film at the 87th Academy Awards.

On November 7, 2016, his work The Road to Mandalay (2016) was screened in his home country for the first time.

Life and career
Chao was born in Lashio, Shan State, Myanmar. Both his parents are of Chinese descent, and his ancestral home is Nanjing. The son of a cook and a doctor, Chao was the youngest of five children and grew up poor. He won a scholarship and moved to Taiwan when he was 16, where he went to high school. Chao received his bachelor's degree and master's degree in design at National Taiwan University of Science and Technology. 

In 2011, he renounced his Burmese citizenship, and became a naturalised citizen of Taiwan. 

He was named Outstanding Taiwanese Filmmaker of the Year at the 53rd Golden Horse Awards in 2016.

Filmography

Features 
2011 : Return to Burma (歸來的人)
2012 : Poor Folk (窮人。榴槤。麻藥。偷渡客)
2014 : Ice Poison (冰毒)
2016 : The Road to Mandalay (再見瓦城)
2019 : Nina Wu (灼人秘密)

Documentaries 
2018 : 14 Apples (十四顆蘋果)
2015 : Jade Miners (挖玉石的人)
2016 : City of Jade (翡翠之城)

Short films 
2014 : The Palace on the Sea

Awards 
2014: Taipei Film Awards: Best Director
2016: 53rd Golden Horse Awards: Outstanding Taiwanese Filmmaker of the Year 
2016: 73rd Venice International Film Festival: FEDEORA Award for Best Film

References

External links 
 

1982 births
Living people
Taiwanese film directors
Taiwanese screenwriters
Burmese people of Chinese descent
Burmese emigrants to Taiwan
Naturalised citizens of Taiwan
People from Shan State